Silas Kiplagat (born 20 August 1989) is a Kenyan middle-distance runner who specialises in the 1500 metres.  He has a personal best of 3:27.64 minutes, which makes him the fifth fastest of all-time over the distance.

Born in Siboh Village, Marakwet District, he started training in seriousness for competitive running in 2008 after completing Chebara high school in Marakwet district. He met Sammy Kitwara and the professional trained with him and introduced him to his coach, Moses Kiptanui, a three-time world champion in the steeplechase. He initially wanted to follow Kitwara into longer distances, but Kiptanui recognised his speed and urged him to try shorter events instead.

He tried his hand at cross country running and was seventeenth at the Kenyan National Cross Country Championships. An appearance at the World's Best 10K in Puerto Rico saw him finish in tenth place. It was only when he ran in the 1500 metres that he showed his true athletic potential: he won the race at the Kenya Prisons Championships and then was runner-up at the National Championships, beaten only by the reigning Olympic champion Asbel Kiprop. Italian coach Renato Canova assisting him technically introduced him to the Italian manager Gianni Demadonna that signed him up, gaining him a place in the 1500 m at the Herculis meeting in Monaco.

His European debut marked a meteoric arrival onto the elite athletics scene – not only did he outrun more experienced runners such as Amine Laâlou and Augustine Choge, but he improved his personal best time by five seconds of 3:29.27 and raised himself into the top ten fastest runners ever for the event. He gained selection for the event at the 2010 African Championships in Athletics and he just missed out on a medal, finishing fourth behind Mekonnen Gebremedhin. He returned to Europe and won at the Internationales Stadionfest and was second at the Rieti Meeting to Asbel Kiprop. After the close of the European summer track and field circuit, he represented Kenya at the 2010 Commonwealth Games in New Delhi. He and James Magut completed a Kenyan 1–2 as Kiplagat became the Commonwealth champion with a tactical performance to beat defending champion Nick Willis.

He won silver at the 2011 World Championships, in a time of 3:35.92.

He competed at the 2012 Summer Olympics, finishing in 7th place in the finals, with a time of 3:36.19.

References

External links

1989 births
Living people
People from Elgeyo-Marakwet County
Kenyan male middle-distance runners
Olympic athletes of Kenya
Athletes (track and field) at the 2010 Commonwealth Games
Commonwealth Games gold medallists for Kenya
Athletes (track and field) at the 2012 Summer Olympics
World Athletics Championships medalists
World Athletics Championships athletes for Kenya
Commonwealth Games medallists in athletics
World Athletics record holders (relay)
Diamond League winners
Medallists at the 2010 Commonwealth Games